Vane is the only studio album by Bleak, an offshoot of the band Lycia, released in 1995 by Projekt Records.

Reception

AllMusic awarded Vane four out of five stars and said "for every more familiar Lycia element there's something extra -- more electronic noises, a playing down of the guitar in favor of other instruments, odd drum patterns -- to mitigate against any of this being simply the equivalent of outtakes from the main band's work." I Die: You Die said "Vane was distinct from Lycia not so much in terms of instrumentation but intent; where contemporary records from the latter project were focused on finding a balance between lushness and severity, Bleak would largely forgo any sense of comfort for, well, bleakness."

Track listing

Personnel 
Adapted from the Vane liner notes.
Bleak
David Galas – synthesizer, drum machine
Mike VanPortfleet – vocals, synthesizer, guitar, drum machine
Production and additional personnel
Bleak – mixing
Susan Jennings – photography

Release history

References

External links 
 
 Vane at Bandcamp
 Vane at iTunes

1995 albums
Projekt Records albums